Roja may refer to:

 Roja (film), a 1992 Tamil-language film by director Mani Ratnam
 Roja (soundtrack), a soundtrack album from the film
 Roja Selvamani, an Indian actress-turned politician
 Roja (Tamil TV series), a 2018 soap opera 
 Roja (Telugu TV series), a 2019 soap opera
 Roja Chamankar, an Iranian poet
 Roja, Latvia, a settlement in Roja Municipality, Latvia